The Spider King's Daughter is a 2012 novel written by Nigerian writer Chibundu Onuzo. It was first published on March 1, 2012, by Faber and Faber.

Plot summary
The novel focuses on Abike Johnson and Runner G. Runner G, a college dropout, who hawks ice-creams on the streets of Lagos. Abike Johnson, who could be seen to be a spoiled child meets together. Their friendship grows as Abike learns to adjust to Runner G.

Reception
The Spider King's Daughter won the 2013 Betty Trask Award. and in 2012 was shortlisted for the Dylan Thomas Prize and the Commonwealth Book Prize. In addition the novel was longlisted for the Desmond Elliott Prize and for the Etisalat Prize for Literature in 2013.

References 

Nigerian romance novels
Contemporary romance novels
2012 Nigerian novels
Faber and Faber books